Donja Orovica is a village in Serbia. It is situated in the Ljubovija municipality, in the Mačva District of Central Serbia. The village had a Serb ethnic majority and a population of 424 in 2002.

Historical population

1948: 963
1953: 1,019
1961: 959
1971: 797
1981: 682
1991: 554
2002: 424

References

See also
List of places in Serbia

Populated places in Mačva District
Ljubovija